Scott Halperin is a Canadian immunologist, professor of pediatrics, microbiology, and immunology at Dalhousie University, the head of Pediatric Infection Diseases at IWK Health Centre, and the director of the Canadian Centre for Vaccinology.

Biography 
Halperin received a B.Sc. from Stanford University, and an M.D. from Cornell University. He did his postdoctoral research in pediatric infectious diseases at the University of Virginia and University of Minnesota.

Career 
Halperin's research focuses on pertussis and other vaccine-preventable diseases. In 2020, the Canadian Centre for Vaccinology at Dalhousie University was approved by Health Canada to begin clinical trial for a potential COVID-19 vaccine, led by Halperin. Halperin's research also focuses on public health policy in relation to the COVID-19 pandemic.

Awards 
From 2004 to 2009, Halperin held the CIHR/Wyeth Pharmaceuticals clinical research chair in vaccines. He received a certificate of merit from the Canadian Paediatric Society in 2009, as well as the Max Forman Senior Research Prize from the Dalhousie Medical Research Foundation, also in 2009.

References 

Living people
Canadian immunologists
Stanford University alumni
Cornell University alumni
Academic staff of the Dalhousie University
Vaccinologists
Year of birth missing (living people)